Steen Ottesen Brahe may refer to:

 Steen Ottesen Brahe (1547–1620), Danish landowner
 Steen Ottesen Brahe (1523–1677), Danish military officer